Harold Ellis CBE FRCS (born 13 January 1926) is an English retired surgeon. He was Emeritus Professor of Surgery in the University of London and most recently a professor in the Department of Anatomy & Human Sciences at the King's College London School of Medicine. He qualified as a doctor from the University of Oxford in July 1948, the same month the National Health Service began. From 1950 to 1951 he undertook national service as a captain in the Royal Army Medical Corps, afterwards continuing his training as a surgical registrar in London, Sheffield and Oxford before taking up a post as senior lecturer in the University of London. In 1962, he took up the foundation chair of surgery at the Westminster Hospital, a post which he held until his retirement from practice in 1989. After a stint teaching anatomy in the University of Cambridge, he took up his present position in 1993.

Ellis is one of the most notable British surgeons of the past fifty years, renowned both for his inspirational teaching and as the author of the definitive student textbook Clinical Anatomy, now in its fourteenth edition. He held positions as a vice-president of the Royal College of Surgeons of England and of the Royal Society of Medicine and was president of the British Association of Surgical Oncology. In 1986 he delivered the Bradshaw Lecture on the subject of breast cancer.

The Professor Harold Ellis Medical Student Prize For Surgery is named after him, and has been awarded by the Royal College of Surgeons since 2007. The International Journal of Surgery has awarded the Harold Ellis Prize in Surgery annually since 2003.

Bibliography
 Ellis, Harold and Mahadevan, Vishy (2019). Clinical Anatomy: Applied Anatomy for Students and Junior Doctors (Fourteenth edition). Oxford: Wiley-Blackwell. .
 Ellis, Harold and Abdalla, Sala (2019). A History of Surgery (Third Edition). CRC Press. .
 Ellis, Harold (2019). Operations that Made History. CRC Press. .
 Ellis, Harold, Calne, Sir Roy Yorke and Watson, Christopher (2006). Lecture notes on general surgery (Eleventh edition). Oxford: Blackwell Scientific. .
 Ellis, Harold (2009). Cambridge Illustrated History of Surgery (Second edition). Cambridge: Cambridge University Press. .
 Kinirons, Mark and Ellis, Harold (2011). French's Index of Differential Diagnosis: An A-Z (Fifteenth edition). Hodder Arnold. .
 Ellis, Harold, Logan, Bari and Dixon, Adrian (2009). Human Sectional Anatomy: Pocket Atlas of Body Sections, CT and MRI Images (Third edition). Hodder Arnold. .
 Ellis, Harold and Watson, Christopher (2001). Pocket Diagnosis in General Surgery (Third edition). Wiley-Blackwell. .
 Ellis, Harold, Feldman, Stanley and Harrop-Griffiths, William (2003). Anatomy for Anaesthetists (Eighth edition). Wiley-Blackwell. .

References

British anatomists
British surgeons
Academics of King's College London
Commanders of the Order of the British Empire
1926 births
Living people
Presidents of the Osler Club of London
Physicians of the Westminster Hospital